The Palazzo San Giacomo, known as the Municipio (city hall) is a Neoclassical style palace in central Naples, Italy. It stands before the fortress of the Maschio Angioino, stradling the zones of Porto and San Ferdinando. It houses the mayor and the offices of the municipality of Naples. The entire office complex spans from largo de Castello to Via Toledo, along via di San Giacomo.

In 1816, King Ferdinand I of the Two Sicilies commissioned the construction of a centralized building to house the various ministries of the government. The area for this palace was chosen, and the buildings therein were either demolished or incorporated including the monastery and church of the Concezione (once known as Santa Maria Fior delle Vergini), the Hospital of San Giacomo, and the offices of the Bank of San Giacomo. The church of San Giacomo degli Spagnoli was incorporated into the palace.

The architects were Vincenzo Buonocore, Antonio De Simone, and Stefano Gasse. Work was only completed in 1825. In the atrium are two statues of Kings Ruggiero the Norman and Frederick of Swabia. The statues of the Bourbon Kings, Ferdinand I and Francesco I of the Two Sicilies, that once stood in niches here, were substituted by allegorical figures. The entry way also has a head from a bust which has been assigned to the mythical representative of Naples, the siren Parthenope.

References

Palaces in Naples
Neoclassical palaces
Neoclassical architecture in Naples
City and town halls in Italy
Buildings and structures completed in 1825
1825 establishments in Italy
19th-century architecture in Italy